Coryphopterus thrix, the bartail goby, is a species of goby found in the Western Atlantic Ocean from southern Florida and the Bahamas all the way to Brazil.  

References

Gobiidae
Fish of the Atlantic Ocean
Fish described in 1960
Taxa named by James Erwin Böhlke
Taxa named by Charles Richard Robins